The List of members from the first term of the Assembly of Experts. consists of names of the members during the first  term of the Assembly of Experts from 1982 to 1990. Elections for the Assembly of Experts occurs every 8 years.

"Assembly of experts (of the Leadership)", or the "Council of Experts" is the deliberative body empowered to appoint and dismiss the Supreme Leader of Iran; and Seyyed Ali Khamenei is the current supreme leader of Iran. Ruhollah Khomeini was the supreme leader of Iran during this term.

The elections took place on 10 December 1982, with the Inauguration occurring on 14 July 1983.

Members 
The list is ordered Alphabetically.

Members with * next to their name, indicates they died while in office.

 Bushehr

          

 Chaharmahal and Bakhtiari

 Ebrahim Amini

 East Azerbaijan

 Abdol Hossein Tabrizi Gharavi - 
 Hibat Allah Yektai -
 Khalil Boyukzadeh
 Mohsen Mojtahed Shabestari
 Moslem Malakouti 
 Seyed Abolfazl Mousavi Tabrizi
 

 Fars

 Ali Mohammad Dastgheib Shirazi
 Assad-Allah Imani 
 
 
 Seyed Ali Asghar Dastgheib 

 Gilan

 Abbas Mahfouzi 
 
 
  

 Hamadan

 Hossein Noori Hamedani 
  

 Hormozgan

 

 Ilam

 Abdul Rahman Heidari Ilami * (1 January 1987)

 Isfahan

 Abbas Izadi * -
 Jalal Al-Din Taheri 
 
Seyed Mohammad Hosseini (Kashani) - 

 Kerman

 Ali Movahedi-Kermani 
  
  

 Kermanshah

 
 Mojtaba Haj Akhund -

 Khorasan

 Abbas Vaez-Tabasi 
 Abolghasem Khazali 
 Abolhassan Moqdasi Shirazi - 
 Abdul Javad Gharavian - 
 Ali Akbar Eslami Torabti - 
 
 
  * (8 July 1985)
 Mohammad Vaez-Abaei

 Khuzestan

 Ahmad Jannati 
 Gholam Hossein Jami - 
 Hassan Hemmati - 
 Hossein Mohammad Mojtahedi - 
 Seyed Mohammad Ali Mousavi Jazayeri

 Kohgiluyeh and Boyer-Ahmad

 Ghorban Ali Shahmiri -

 Kurdistan

 
 Seyed Ali Hosseini -

 Lorestan

 
 

 Markazi

   
 Mohammad Fazel Lankarani
 Seyed Mahdi Rohani

 Mazandaran

 Abdollah Javadi-Amoli
 
 Hadi Rohani
 Hossein Mohammadi La'ini -
  
 Seyed Kazem Noor Mofidi 

 Semnan

 Mohammad Momen

 Sistan and Baluchestan

 
Seyed Mahdi Abadi -

 Tehran

 Ahmad Azari Qomi
 Akbar Hashemi Rafsanjani 
 Ali Meshkini 
 Gholamreza Rezvani 
 
 Mohammad Baqer Baqeri Kani
 Mohammad Mohammadi Gilani 
 Mohammed Emami-Kashani 
 Sadegh Khalkhali 
 Seyed Abdul-Karim Mousavi Ardebili 
 Seyed Ali Khamenei 
 Seyed Hadi Khosroshahi 
 Seyed Mohammad Baqer Asadi Khonsari -
 Yousef Saanei 

 West Azerbaijan

  
 Morteza Bani Fazel -
 Seyed Ali Akbar Ghoreishi

 Yazd

 Seyed Ruhollah Khatami * (27 October 1988)

 Zanjan

  
 Seyed Mohammad Mousavi Khoeiniha
 Seyed Esmaeil Mousavi Zanjani

See also 
 1982 Iranian Assembly of Experts election
 Assembly of Experts
 List of members in the Second Term of the Council of Experts
 List of members in the Third Term of the Council of Experts
 List of members in the Fourth Term of the Council of Experts
 List of members in the Fifth Term of the Council of Experts
 List of chairmen of the Assembly of Experts

References 

Assembly of Experts
Lists of office-holders
Electoral colleges
Politics of Iran
Government of the Islamic Republic of Iran
Assemblies in Iran